Silvia Andrea Santos Luz (born March 5, 1975 in Araçatuba), nicknamed Silvinha, is a Brazilian women's basketball player. She represented her country twice at the Summer Olympics, starting in 1996 (Atlanta, Georgia), and won a silver and a bronze medal with the Brazil women's national basketball team.

References

External links
 

1975 births
Living people
People from Araçatuba
Brazilian women's basketball players
Basketball players at the 1996 Summer Olympics
Basketball players at the 2000 Summer Olympics
Olympic basketball players of Brazil
Olympic silver medalists for Brazil
Olympic bronze medalists for Brazil
Olympic medalists in basketball
Medalists at the 2000 Summer Olympics
Medalists at the 1996 Summer Olympics
Sportspeople from São Paulo (state)